Deep Cuts from Dark Clouds is the sixth album by American sludge metal band 16. It is the band's second release with Relapse Records. The album marks the band's last collaboration with bassist Tony Baumeister, and the band's only recording with drummer Mateo.

Track listing

Personnel 
 Cris Jerue – vocals
 Bobby Ferry – guitar
 Tony Baumeister – bass
 Mateo – drums

Production 
 Produced, engineered and mixed by Jeff Forrest
 Mastered by Scott Hull
 Artwork and design by Orion Landau

References

16 (band) albums
2012 albums